The configuration of a car body is typically determined by the layout of the engine, passenger and luggage compartments, which can be shared or separately articulated. A key design feature is the car's roof-supporting pillars, designated from front to rear of the car as A-pillar, B-pillar, C-pillar and D-pillar.

Common car body configurations are one-box (e.g., a van, minivan, MPV), two-box (e.g., a hatchback) and three-box (e.g., a sedan/saloon) designs.

One-box design

A one-box design, also called a monospace, mono-box or monovolume configuration—approximates in shape a single volume comprising engine, cabin and cargo areas, in part by locating the base of a vehicle's A-pillars further forward. 

One-box designs include light commercial vehicles, minivans, MPVs and mini MPVs. Passenger cars with a one-box design include the 1984 Renault Espace, 1992 Renault Twingo I, 2008 Tata Nano, 2005 Toyota Aygo/Citroën C1/Peugeot 107 and 1997 Mercedes-Benz A-Class.

Two-box design
Two-box designs articulate a volume for engine and a volume that combines passenger and cargo volumes, e.g., station wagon/estate or (three or five-door) hatchbacks like the Saab 900, and minivans like the Chrysler minivan, 2001 Volkswagen Polo Mk4 and 1999 Skoda Fabia Mk1.

Three-box design 

Three-box design is a broad automotive styling term describing a coupé, sedan/saloon, notchback or hatchback where—when viewed in profile—principal volumes are articulated into three separate compartments or boxes: engine, passenger and cargo.  

Three-box designs are highly variable.  Hemmings Motor News said:

Where the Renault Dauphine is a three-box that carries its engine in the rear and its cargo up front, the styling of the Škoda Octavia integrates a hatchback with the articulation of a three-box. This style was later used by its larger Škoda Superb, which marketed as the TwinDoor, within the liftgate operable as a trunk lid or as a full hatchback. As with the third generation European Ford Escort (also a hatchback), the third box may be vestigial.  And three-box styling does not need to be boxy: Car Design News calls the fluid and rounded Fiat Linea a three-box design—and most examples of the markedly bulbous styling of the ponton genre are three-box designs.

In 2012, Hemmings Motor News wrote "the three-box sedan design is seen as traditional or—worse—conventional." 
By 2016 In the United States, the three-box sedan began to wane in popularity.  In 2018, the Wall Street Journal wrote: "from gangster getaway cars and the Batmobile to the humble family sedan, the basic three-box configuration of a passenger car—low engine compartment, higher cabin, low trunk in the rear—has endured for decades as the standard shape of the automobile.  Until now."

Sales and popularity of 4-door notchback sedans/saloons began declining in Europe since mid-1990s, especially affordable ones. This is resulted in moving production of Volkswagen Jetta in Mexico, as well as the Peugeot abandoning that segment since 2001 when the production of Peugeot 306 ended. Other, predominantly European manufacturers followed suit, with the most recent generation of Opel Astra may no longer to be offered as the 4-door notchback. Since 2018, Ford reduced sales of 4-door Focus as well as Mondeo to Eastern Balkans markets. Again, Volkswagen stopped sales of Jetta in Europe around the same time due to too long dimensions, exceeding those with International Passat B8.

Car roof classification
A related classification is based on the style of roof in the car design. The DrivAer aerodynamics model of the Technical University of Munich classifies roof styles as (F) Fastback, (E) Estate Back, (N) Notchback/Sedan.

See also
Ponton styling
Coke bottle styling
Glossary of automotive design

References

Car body styles